Noah Delgado (born December 30, 1979 in Fremont, California) is a former professional soccer player who is currently head coach for USL Championship club Oakland Roots SC. He is a member of the El Salvador National Team Gold Cup staff.

Career

High school and college
Delgado attended Irvington High School, where he was a member of the school's soccer team during his four years, and was also a kicker for their football team for two years. The team was North Coast Section champs during his junior and senior seasons. He played college soccer at Fresno State University, scoring 28 goals and registering 20 assists in 76 games during his four seasons at the school.

Professional
Delgado was drafted by the Los Angeles Galaxy of the MLS in the fourth round (48th overall) of the 2002 MLS SuperDraft, but was not offered a contract with the team. In 2002, he played five games for the Portland Timbers in the USL A-League. In 2003, he played for Syracuse Salty Dogs, and then for Rochester Raging Rhinos in 2004.

Delgado joined the Puerto Rico Islanders in 2005, being one of only two players to play in all of the 28 games of the season. Since then he has become a key figure in the Islanders' midfield. In 2008, he was named co-captain, an honor he shares with Petter Villegas. In 2008, he led the Islanders to the USL-1 Finals and the CONCACAF Champions League Quarter-finals. He became captain of the Puerto Rico Islanders for the 2009 season and remains the captain for the 2010 and 2011 seasons.  Delgado re-signed with the Islanders for the 2011 season on March 24, 2011.

In 2014, Delgado played for the San Francisco Stompers of the NPSL.

International
Delgado was eligible to play for the Puerto Rico national football team after living and playing in the island for a couple of years. He was called up in 2008 for friendlies against Bermuda. He played on the team from 2008 to 2012 earning a total of 23 caps.

See also
 List of Puerto Ricans

References

External links
 Puerto Rico Islanders bio
 Fresno State bio
 

1979 births
Living people
Fresno State Bulldogs men's soccer players
Puerto Rican footballers
Puerto Rico international footballers
Portland Timbers (2001–2010) players
Syracuse Salty Dogs players
Rochester New York FC players
Puerto Rico Islanders players
People from Fremont, California
A-League (1995–2004) players
USL First Division players
USSF Division 2 Professional League players
North American Soccer League players
Soccer players from California
LA Galaxy draft picks
Association football midfielders
Sportspeople from Alameda County, California
National Premier Soccer League players
Oakland Roots SC players